Sergio Machin (sometimes also spelt Makin, born 6 July 1952) is a Croatian retired football player.

Club career
Born in Rijeka, as a player he was part of HNK Rijeka's golden generation which won the Yugoslav Cup in 1978 and 1979.  He was an all round player that could play as a defender, midfielder and forward, although he was most comfortable in the midfield.  Although one of Rijeka's most talented players, he never made an appearance for the Yugoslav national team due to biases in favour of players from the "big four" (Red Star Belgrade, Partizan Belgrade, Dinamo Zagreb and Hajduk Split).  Before finishing his career, he played the second half of the 1981-82 season with another Yugoslav First League club, NK Zagreb.

Personal life
Currently, Sergio Machin lives in Novigrad, Istria, where he runs a hotel.

Honours
NK Rijeka
Yugoslav Second League: 1970-71, 1971–72, 1973–74
Yugoslav Cup: 1978, 1979
Balkans Cup: 1978

Club statistics

References

1952 births
Living people
Footballers from Rijeka
Croatian people of Italian descent
Yugoslav people of Italian descent
Association football midfielders
Yugoslav footballers
HNK Rijeka players
NK Zagreb players
Yugoslav First League players